Talamona (Lombard: Talamuna) is a comune (municipality) in the Province of Sondrio in the Italian region Lombardy, located about  northeast of Milan and about  west of Sondrio.

Talamona borders the following municipalities: Albaredo per San Marco, Ardenno, Dazio, Forcola, Morbegno, Tartano.

Demographic evolution

References

External links
 www.comune.talamona.so.it/

Cities and towns in Lombardy